On February 3, 2014, 15-year-old high school student Sergey Gordeyev (also spelled Sergei Gordeev) opened fire at School No. 263 in Otradnoye District, Moscow, Russia, killing a teacher. Gordeyev then took 29 students hostage, killed one police officer, and injured another. Later on, he surrendered to the authorities. It is the second reported school shooting in Russia's modern history.

Shooting
At around 11:40 A.M., Gordeyev, concealing his weapons with a bag and fur coat, went to his school armed with a small-caliber rifle and shotgun that belonged to his father, a police colonel. He threatened the security guard and went to his geography classroom, where he shot his teacher, 29-year-old Andrey Kirillov, first in the stomach, then fatally shot him in the head upon seeing he was still alive. After killing Kirillov, he then took the class of 29 students hostage. Gordeyev then shot at responding police officers in the school, wounding Warrant Officer Sergei Bushuyev, 38, and Senior Sergeant Vladimir Krokhin, 29; Bushuyev later died at the scene, while Krokhin survived a gunshot wound to the shoulder.

About an hour after the shooting first started, the Special Forces responded to the scene. Gordeyev initially called his mother before the Special Forces called in his father to negotiate with him. He initially spoke with Gordeyev on the phone for fifteen minutes before being brought into the school with a bulletproof vest to personally talk to him; thirty minutes afterward, Gordeyev released the hostages. At around 1:00 P.M., Gordeyev surrendered to authorities and was captured. A Russian report stated that a total of eleven shots were fired by Gordeyev during the shooting.

Victims
Two people were killed in the shooting, while a third was wounded. The victims were:

Andrey Kirillov, 29 (teacher, killed)
Warrant Officer Sergey Bushuyev, 38 (policeman, killed)
Senior Sergeant Vladimir Krokhin, 29 (policeman, wounded)

Perpetrator
15-year-old Sergey Gordeyev (born October 4, 1998) was identified as the perpetrator of the shooting. He attended School No. 263, had a very good reputation, which was due to an excellent school record. He was described as a "model student" who sets up "an example for the whole school".

Two possible motives were given. According to the first, which was later rejected, Gordeyev opened fire from revenge against the geography teacher who was trying to interfere with his planned graduation with honors – and Kirillov was fixed upon as the teacher Gordeyev had conflicts with. Another version suggested that Gordeyev had an emotional disorder, yet he had had no previous apparent conflicts with either teachers or fellow pupils, although some described him as "strange". Sergei Gordeyev believed in the theory of solipsism—that the only life that truly existed was his own—and considered other people to be an illusion. Gordeyev's initial plans were to come to school, tell his classmates about his thoughts, and shoot himself, but he chose to shoot the geography teacher because "no one believed that he would shoot."

A medical examination confirmed that Gordeyev has symptoms of paranoid schizophrenia. The court sentenced him to involuntary treatment in a psychiatric hospital. Later, the court also obliged the parents of Gordeyev to pay a certain sum of money in support of the son of the killed teacher.

Reaction
Politician Irina Yarovaya mentioned that the event might be linked to violent video games and recommended tighter gun control.

Politician Aleksey Pushkov suggested exposure to American culture might be to blame.

Moscow Mayor Sergey Sobyanin later stated that schools in Moscow have been set to be reviewed for security.

At a meeting with theater workers, Russian President Vladimir Putin said that such tragedies might be prevented by placing a greater emphasis on culture in children's upbringing, such as the theatrical arts.

See also
 School shootings in Europe
 List of attacks related to secondary schools

References

Attacks in Russia in 2014
2014 in Russia
2014 in Moscow
Deaths by firearm in Russia
Murder in Moscow
Mass shootings in Russia
School shootings committed by pupils
School killings in Russia
Hostage taking in Russia
2014 murders in Russia
2014 mass shootings in Europe
School shootings in Russia
Attacks in Russia